Poliana leucomelas is a moth of the  family Sphingidae. It is known from Thailand.

Description

References

Sphingini
Moths described in 1915